Caecum cinctum is a species of minute sea snail, a marine gastropod mollusk or micromollusk in the family Caecidae.

Distribution

Description 

The maximum recorded shell length is 2.8 mm.

Habitat 
Minimum recorded depth is 0 m. Maximum recorded depth is 2 m.

References

Caecidae
Gastropods described in 1953